.hack//Liminality is an OVA series directly related to the .hack video game series for the PlayStation 2, with the perspective of Liminality focused on the real world as opposed to the games' MMORPG The World. Liminality was separated into four volumes; each volume was released with its corresponding game. The initial episode is 45 minutes long, while subsequent episodes are 30 minutes long. The video series was directed by Koichi Mashimo, written by Kazunori Itō with music by Yuki Kajiura. Primary Animation production was handled by Mashimo's studio Bee Train which collaborated for the four games as well as handled major production on .hack//Sign.

Releases
The games were packaged with DVDs featuring  episodes of .hack//Liminality, an original video animation (OVA) series that depicts events that occur concurrently with the games. The OVA series was meant to give perspective on fictional events happening in the "real world" outside the game.

 "Vol. 1: In The Case of Mai Minase" (with .hack//Infection)
 "Vol. 2: In The Case of Yuki Aihara" (with .hack//Mutation)
 "Vol. 3: In The Case of Kyoko Tohno" (with .hack//Outbreak)
 "Vol. 4: Trismegistus" (with .hack//Quarantine)

In the case of Mai Minase

The episode starts when Tokuoka was kicked out of CC Corp. Mai and her boyfriend, Tomonari Kasumi (known to The World as Sieg), are taken to a hospital due to both of them collapsing while playing a MMORPG called The World. Despite Mai waking up shortly after arriving at the hospital, Tomonari remains in a coma. For this, Mai is the object of rumors, especially when the clubhouse (known as G-study) is closed after the incident. It is soon revealed that she heard a certain sound (which is also present at important points in .hack//Sign) shortly before collapsing, and she later discovers that it is A in C major, which is used to tune instruments, including her violin. It was this sound that enabled her to wake up, and it was the first sound she made when she did. She meets Junichiro Tokuoka, and although she distrusts him at the beginning, as they investigate into Tomonari's coma, they soon become allies, if not friends. The investigation itself starts with Tokuoka accessing Tomonari's (Sieg's) account on The World, with Mai providing the password. Tokuoka accidentally opens the e-mail, and discovers that two users, Yukichin and Kyo, are close with Tomonari and have been harassing him with e-mails regarding his absence. It is also revealed during the course of the episode that Tomonari took the name "Sieg" as a contraction of Siegfried, from Richard Wagner's operatic cycle Der Ring des Nibelungen. Balmung is the name of Siegfried's sword, and Tomonari told Mai that he would become the possessor rather than the sword: a reference to the fact that he aimed to surpass the player character Balmung of the Azure Sky, one of the Descendants of Fianna. Tokuoka and Mai's investigation leads them to break into G-study, in order to attempt to recreate the same situation so that they can find out why Mai and Tomonari collapsed. The sound starts up again when they enter a field, and although Mai saves herself, Tokuoka seems to be losing it. In desperation, Mai destroys the monitor and the computer that they were using, and drags him outside, where a splash of rainwater wakes him up. After that, the two pledge to find out just what C.C.Corp. is hiding, and what it will take to wake everyone up.

An interesting easter egg is if you turn on the subtitles, in the scene where Tomonari's friend is fixing the computer, for a few seconds, keywords will pop up. Those keywords in the Theta server lead to where the Soul Blades reside.

In the case of Yuki Aihara

Tokuoka and Mai are on their way to meet with Yuki (known to The World as Yukichin), who is in Yokohama. Tokuoka gets stuck in traffic, and Mai goes to the library in Tokyo to attempt to look up information. During this time, she hears the sound. Meanwhile, Yuki is watching a movie when suddenly THE WORLD flashes on the screen, the power goes out, and the employees attempt to evacuate the building. Yuki runs into an unnamed woman who works at the building, and the two try to find their way out while the crowd gets stuck on the broken escalators. The two eventually resort to climbing through a ventilation shaft to a hallway with an elevator. After the fire alarm activates and starts sending out carbon dioxide, the woman rips off her shirt sleeves and makes mittens for both of them to slide down the elevator cables. At the same time, Tokuoka is finding his way to the meeting point without his car, as it's still trapped in gridlock, and Mai is using an old offline newspaper reel to look up information. She comes across Harald Hoerwick (the creator of The World), and the Epitaph of Twilight. Later, she contacts Kyo, and finds out that fires have broken out all over Yokohama, and that there is no cell phone service there either. Yuki and the woman find themselves at the bottom of the shaft, and it seems that the woman has twisted her ankle. They make their way onto the first floor regardless, and discover upon exiting the building that many cars have crashed. The woman says that it is the second coming of Pluto's Kiss. Finally, at 9:00, six hours after Tokuoka said that he would meet Yuki, he arrives to find Yuki waiting for him. Mai finally gets through to Tokuoka, and Kyo gets through to Yuki, and it is discovered that Kyo knows quite a bit about the Epitaph of Twilight.

In the case of Kyoko Tohno

Junichiro Tokuoka travels to the city of Hida-Takayama to meet up with a miss Kyoko Tohno to discuss further details surrounding the mysteries in The World as well as the legends surrounding The Epitaph of Twilight.

After receiving a phone call from a person working under the alias Bith the Black, Tokuoka and Kyoko realize that they are being watched by Helba's agents. A series of messages from Bith lead them to numerous historical sites throughout the city. As several of the messages come from e-mails sent to Mai Minase and Yuki Aihara, Tokuoka suspects that Helba has been following their actions for quite some time.

The team begins to eventually put together the puzzle behind the mysterious woman of  Emma Wielant the author of the Epitaph. After a chance run in with Kyoko's Father, they discover that he was contacted by Bith as well, working under another alias "Ichiro Sato".

Over lunch Ichiro explains that Harald Hoerwick had used the game Fragment, the precursor to The World, to create a tribute to Emma's Epitaph of Twilight. But that alone wouldn't explain the current situation facing The World. He goes on to say that the incidents involving the coma victims were created as a result of Harald attempting to bring the real world into the online world, creating a hazy barrier between the two worlds, a concept called "Liminality".

Ichiro informs Tokuoka and Kyoko that he needs their help, but that in helping him, they will become criminals. Despite the risk, they both agree to help. Ichiro says that CC Corp intends to shut down the servers of The World, thereby destroying any possible clues to awakening the coma victims. He tells them to meet with him on Christmas Eve at Urayasu, then drives away. Tokuoka asks Kyoko if she's really sure about helping him, causing her to reaffirm her commitment to the cause.

Trismegistus

Several weeks after the meeting in Hida-Takayama on Christmas Eve, Junichiro Tokuoka, Kyoko Tohno, Yuki Aihara, and Mai Minase all gather on a dinner boat in Tokyo Bay, to prepare for their risky (and most certainly illegal) mission.   Despite their nervousness, each one is dedicated to helping Ichiro Sato complete the mission sent from Helba.  Ichiro himself soon arrives on a different boat. While traveling to their destination, Ichiro reveals the true nature of the problems that have been plaguing The World. Harald Hoerwick's program, Fragment, had been nothing more than a program to create an "Ultimate AI". The system to create this A.I. had somehow become self autonomous, and was working to delay the birth of the A.I. known as Aura, to keep itself from finishing its purpose and ceasing to exist.  If the problems are to be solved, the Ultimate A.I. must be born, and it's up to Tokuoka and his team to help that event occur.

Under the cover of night they sneak into a CC Corp data station located on the edge of the bay. Avoiding the guards, Ichiro hacks into the security system allowing them to enter the main building. Inside the central control room, Tokuoka begins setting up their hardware to gain access to the computer systems and join up in Helba's private server. Unfortunately the data has to compile, an act which will take about 15–20 minutes to complete. While he waits, Tokuoka asks Yuki to bring him some coffee from a vending machine. She gets the coffee and brings it to him, not realizing that she just created several new problems.  By using the vending machines she has triggered the security system potentially alerting the night security patrol staff to their presence.

Outside, a patrol car comes by, investigating the entrance into the facility. They figure it is nothing more than a system error but realize somebody is actually inside when they discover that somebody used one of the vending machines inside. Realizing they have been discovered, Ichiro enlists the help of Yuki and Kyoko to buy Tokuoka and Mai some time.

The data now compiled Tokuoka logs into The World using Sieg's account.  Mai finds herself watching a battle involving Sieg and a character named Orca. Suddenly, the server begins to malfunction and crash as CC Corp begins deleting their servers. Tokuoka realizes that if they complete this, everybody who is currently fighting will fall into a coma and the Ultimate A.I. will never be born. As he struggles to come up with a solution, Ichiro comes in and announces that they're out of time.

Walking out of the police station, he finds Mai and the girls waiting for him. Mai says that the Ultimate A.I. has finally been born, and Tokuoka pulls out a disk containing enough evidence to bring CC Corp to court. The four happily go out to eat and celebrate their victory.

Music

Theme songs
The music and lyrics of all opening themes and the one ending theme were composed by Yuki Kajiura, and were performed by See-Saw.

 Openings
 Edge
 
 
 
 Ending:

CDs

The .hack//Liminality Original Soundtrack Plus is a two disc set composed by Yuki Kajiura. The first disc is a 12 cm CD containing tracks of the OVA series and the second disc is an 8 cm CD titled .hack//Liminality Bonus Single and is the single for the opening themes: Thousand and One Nights and Edge. The third track, "Grandpa's Violin", is the violin piece that plays in the background when An Shouji and Mariko Misono meet for the first time at the end of episode 26 of .hack//Sign, Return. It was released on September 21, 2002 in Japan and in North America it was released with the third .hack//Sign Limited Edition DVD. A single by  See-Saw titled  was a single for the OVA series and was released on January 22, 2003.

References

External links
 hack.channel.or.jp—Official Japanese website
 
 
 
 
 

2002 anime OVAs
Anime OVAs composed by Yuki Kajiura
Bee Train Production
Liminality
OVAs based on video games